Coleophora coarctataephaga is a moth of the family Coleophoridae. It is found in Romania, Bulgaria, North Macedonia, Albania and Greece.

The larvae feed on the leaves of Achillea coarctata.

References

coarctataephaga
Moths described in 1994
Moths of Europe